Nupserha vexator is a species of beetle in the family Cerambycidae. It was described by Francis Polkinghorne Pascoe in 1858. It is known from Sri Lanka.

References

vexator
Beetles described in 1858